The equestrian statue of George Stuart White is a Grade II listed outdoor bronze sculpture depicting 
Field Marshal Sir George Stuart White, an officer of the British Army, located in Portland Place, London, England. The sculptor was John Tweed and the statue was unveiled in 1922.

An inscription on each side of the plinth reads:

The statue appeared in an exterior shot of Portland Place from Alfred Hitchcock's 1947 American courtroom drama, The Paradine Case, which was set in England.

References

External links
 

1922 establishments in the United Kingdom
1922 sculptures
Bronze sculptures in the United Kingdom
Monuments and memorials in London
Outdoor sculptures in London
White, George Stuart
White, George Stuart